St Michael's College (Irish: Coláiste Mhíchíl) is a Roman Catholic boys' grammar school located in Enniskillen, Northern Ireland.

Named for St Michael the Archangel, the school educates boys in County Fermanagh and the surrounding areas. The school is located within the parish of Enniskillen, one of the largest parishes in the Diocese of Clogher. The school's feast day is 29 September. The current principal is Mark Henry (2016–present).

Location
The college is situated on Drumclay Hill, about half a mile from Enniskillen town centre. It is built on an elevated site and enjoys a view of the Mill Lough, Cuilcagh Mountain, Topped Mountain and the surrounding countryside.

History

St Michael's Grammar School was established to cater for the educational needs of Catholic boys from the northern half of the Diocese of Clogher. From 1903 until 1957, St Michael's was run by the Presentation Brothers at its Belmore Street site, where The Clinton Centre now stands. It was then taken over by the diocese under the then Bishop of Clogher, the Most Rev Eugene O'Callaghan and rebuilt at Drumclay.

In 1952, the site was purchased by Monsignor Gannon. During the summer of 1956, Patrick Mulligan was appointed to run the college. Work on the grammar school started in 1958; during that time, classes were held at the original location on East Bridge Street.

In September 1963, the buildings were completed and all classes were moved from East Bridge Street to Drumclay. The college has undergone extensive development and expansion since that time. The original site was expanded in the late 1950s to accommodate an increase in the number of students from 200 to 300. The next expansion occurred in 1966, with the addition of four new classrooms, including a modern language department, laboratory, a bookstore and a teachers' recreation room.

In more recent years, a new technology block has been added, and many of the science labs have been renovated. Since its foundation, the college has continued to grow and expand. It now has over 700 students, a teaching staff of 50 and a support staff of 35.  However the school has also experienced a sharp academic decline, with the college being the worst performing grammar school in Northern Ireland in 2016, and consistently ranks near the bottom
in grammar school exam performance.

St Michael's College presidents

Since the college was taken over by the diocese in 1957, a total of six priests have taken up the role of college president. In 2006, Eugene McCullough was the first lay person appointed to lead the college. Patrick Mulligan, a native of County Fermanagh, was the first president of the college and served in the post for nine years. He oversaw the planning and building of the college at Drumclay as well as its first two expansions.

Less than three years after his retirement from the post, he was appointed Bishop of Clogher. He resigned that position in 1979 due to ill health and died in 1991. The second principal was John McElroy, also a native of County Fermanagh, who remained in the post until 1977. One of his students was future president, Joseph McGuinness. McElroy later became parish priest of Aghalurcher, near Lisnaskea; he died in 2004.

In 1977, Peadar Livingstone briefly held the position of president, before assuming parish duties in Broomfield, County Monaghan, near his native Castleblayney. By the time he took up the post, he was already known for his local historical work, The Fermanagh Story; he completed The Monaghan Story in 1980. He was succeeded at the end of the year by Macartan McQuaid, also a native of County Monaghan. McQuaid officially assumed the post of president in January 1978 and was the longest serving president of St Michael's College. McQuaid oversaw major extension work at the college. During his tenure, the number of students attending the school gradually grew from 500 to over 700. McQuaid retired in 1993, and was appointed parish priest of Irvinestown. He returned as chaplain in 2007.

In 1994, Patrick MacEntee, a native of the town of Monaghan, assumed the position of president. MacEntee joined the staff of the college in 1977 with his appointment as dean. He resigned as president in 2000 and is now parish priest of Dromore. He was succeed in September 2000 by Joseph McGuinness, originally from Lisnaskea in County Fermanagh, and the only past pupil of the college to become president. McGuinness retired as president in August 2006. In September 2007, he was appointed to the position of parish priest of Enniskillen. The school's first lay principal, Eugene J. McCullough, took up his post on 1 September 2006. Mccullough, educated in County Antrim, is the former president of St Mary's College, Irvinestown, County Fermanagh. McCullough retired in 2016 after ten years as principal.

Mark Henry was appointed to be the new principal of the college in September 2016. Henry began teaching at St Michael's in 1995 and went on to become the vice-principal in 2007.

Sports
St Michael's teams have excelled in many sports most notably Gaelic Football. In 2006, St Michael's won the Rannafast Cup.

MacRory Cup
The school's teams have won the MacRory Cup 7 times, making St. Michael's the 6th most successful college in the competition's history. After wins in 1973 and 1992, the school entered its most successful spell in 1999, reaching the final in four consecutive years, winning in 1999, 2001 and 2002. Following a 10-year drought, the school lifted the trophy in 2012, beating St Patrick's College, Maghera in the final by 0–09 to 1–04. After a  seven year lapse, St. Michael's took the MacRory Cup home to Drumclay once again on Monday 18 March 2019 when they beat Omagh CBS 0–16 to 2–6 at the athletic grounds in Armagh.

St Michael's were runners-up in the competition on seven (7) occasions, most recently the 2008 final. The team qualified for the final with a win of 1–17 to 0–7 over St Eunan's, Letterkenny, before being defeated by St Patrick's, Dungannon, in the final on Monday, 17 March (St Patrick's Day) 2008.

After winning their 7th MacRory Cup the team entered into the Hogan Cup semi-final against St. Colman's, Claremorris on 30 March, winning 2–13 to 1–10, progressing to their third Hogan Cup final. On Saturday 6 April 2019, St. Michael's claimed their first ever Hogan Cup (an all-Ireland title) in Croke Park with a one-point victory over Naas CBS (1–12 to 1–11).

Run For Oisin
St Michael's organise an annual run around the grounds of the school in memory of Oisin McGrath, a past pupil of the school, who died in a playground incident. This run raises money for the Oisin McGrath Foundation.

Notable former pupils

 Dominic Corrigan (b. 1961/1962) Gaelic footballer, also taught at the college
 Tomás Corrigan (b. 1990), Gaelic footballer, son of Dominic
 T.P. Flanagan (1929–2011) – artist
 Frank McManus (b. 1942), Independent Nationalist MP for Fermanagh and South Tyrone (1970–1974)
 Frank Ormsby (b. 1947), poet and former editor of The Honest Ulsterman
Sir Patrick Hugh Haren (b. 1950), businessman (Viridian Group); knighted for services to the electricity industry in Northern Ireland   
 Fearghal McKinney (b. 1962), television presenter, journalist and politician
 Nigel McLoughlin (b. 1968), writer, poet, academic (University of Gloucestershire)
 Ciarán McMenamin (b. 1975), actor
 Martin McGrath (born 1981) – Gaelic footballer
 Phil Flanagan (b. 1984), Sinn Féin Fermanagh and South Tyrone MLA

See also
Diocese of Clogher
Patrick Mulligan first College President and Bishop of Clogher

References

External links
School website
School Twitter account

Catholic secondary schools in Northern Ireland
Educational institutions established in 1957
Grammar schools in County Fermanagh
Secondary schools in County Fermanagh
Enniskillen
Boys' schools in Northern Ireland
1957 establishments in Northern Ireland